Anatoliy Aleksandrovich Weissman (known professionally as Anatoliy Aleksandrovich Beliy ; born 1 August 1972) is a Russian actor. He was awarded the Merited Artist of the Russian Federation in 2006.

Biography
Anatoliy Beliy was born in Bratslav in 1972. He grew up in Tolyatti, where his mother and father worked on the construction of the Volga Automobile Plant. Later his mother worked as a German teacher at a school.

After graduating from school in 1989, Anatoliy entered the Kuibyshev Aviation Institute, where he studied in the specialty "electronic computers, systems, complexes and networks".  In parallel with his studies at the institute, he was fond of playing the guitar, participated in KVN, played in the national youth theater.

He took part in the people's youth theater, but later realized that the specialty he was studying was not for him. Beliy went to Moscow and entered the Mikhail Shchepkin Higher Theatre School (workshop of Nikolai Afonin), which he graduated from in 1995. He did military service in the Theater of the Russian Army.

Since 1998 he has been an actor at the Stanislavski and Nemirovich-Danchenko Theatre, since 2003 - actor of the Moscow Art Theater. A.P. Chekhov. On September 25, 2015, he opened the theatrical online readings of A. Chekhov's works "Chekhov is Alive".
Anatoliy has been interested in sports since childhood. He is a master of sports in acrobatics and has skills in fencing.

The pseudonym "Beliy" is a translation of the surname from the German name "Weisman" into Russian. He was often credited under the name Weisman.

Beliy spoke out against the Russian invasion of Ukraine, and in July 2022 quit the Moscow Art Theatre and left Russia.

Theatrical works 
 Romeo and Juliet Shakespeare a.  Director: Robert Sturua, New Globe Production Center -  Mercutio 
 Mata Hari.  Director: Olga Subbotina, Strelkov Theater together with the Theater A Parte - Andrey
 Cuckoo, P. Gladilin's entreprise
 Captive Spirits.  Director: Vladimir Ageev - Andrey Bely 
 Bummeroff.  Director: Mikhail Ugarov -  Stolz 
 Moscow - an open city - mini-performance Set-2.  Director: Olga Subbotina
 Candid Polaroid Pictures.  Director: Kirill Serebrennikov -  Victor 
 A. is different.  Director: Olga Subbotina -  Gerd
 Transfer.  Director: Mikhail Ugarov - Alexey
 The Days of the Turbins by M. A. Bulgakov.  Dir.  Sergey Zhenovach -  Shervinsky 
 King Lear.  Director: Tadashi Suzuki -  Lear 
 Prima Donnas Director: Evgeny Pisarev -  Pastor Duncan 
 Pillow Man Martin McDonagh.  Director: Kirill Serebrennikov -  Katurian
 Playing the victim based on the play of the same name by The Presnyakov Brothers - several roles.  Director: Kirill Serebrennikov
 The Seagull Anton Chekhov.  Director:  Oleg Efremov , 2001 version - dir.  N. Skorik - Trigorin.
 Rosencrantz and Guildenstern Are Dead Tom Stoppard.  Director: Pavel Safronov, Another Theater -  Guildenstern .
 The Break by I. Goncharov - dir.  Adolph Shapiro.  Paradise 
 The Duel by Anton Chekhov - dir.  A. Yakovlev -  Laevsky 
 Terrorism - dir.  Kirill Serebrennikov - several roles
 Woe from Wit - dir.  Oleg Menshikov - Zagoretsky 
 Twelfth Night, The Taming of the Shrew - dir.  Vladimir Mirzoev -  Sebastian,  Lucentio 
 The Master and Margarita based on the work of the same name Mikhail Bulgakov - dir.  Janos Sas -  Master 
  - dir.  Kirill Serebrennikov -  Egor

Filmography

Actor's work 
 1996 - Kings of the Russian investigation
 1999 - Mother - pimp 
 2001 - The Perfect Match
 2001 - Ordinary days -  Larik 
 2001 - Master of the Empire -  Oleg 
 2002 - Brigada -  Igor Vvedensky's assistant 
 2002 - The Killer's Diary -  Ilya, Polina's former classmate 
 2003 - Savior under the Birches -  businessman Bald 
 2003 - Taste of Murder
 2003 - Mail Order Bride /  Mail Order Bride  (Italy-USA-RF) -  Dancer 
 2003 - Thieves and prostitutes.  Prize - space flight -  Vasya Stalin's guard 
 2004 - Obsession -  Investigator Sobol 
 2005 - Talisman of love -  Alexander Uvarov 
 2005 - Multiplier sadness -  Alexander Serebrovsky 
 2006 - Wolfhound -  Vinitar 
 2006 - Film Festival -  Pashka Zhuk 
 2006 - Tin -  Alexander 
 2006 - Seventh day - Nikolai
 2007 - Let's play -  Dr. Apollon Karlovich 
 2007 - On the way to the heart -  Alexey Kovalev, cardiac surgeon 
 2007 - I will never forget you! -  Vladimir Volin 
 2007 - Paragraph 78 -  Spam 
 2007 - Yarik -  Boris 
 2008 - Lord Officers: Save the Emperor -  Commissioner Bates 
 2008 - Zastava Zhilina -  Tereykin, senior lieutenant, head of the outpost 
 2008 - Revenge: The Other Side of Love -  Andrey Zhitkov 
 2008 - Nobody but us -  classmate of Evgeny Levashov 
 2008 - Pari -  Igor 
 2008 - The most beautiful 2 -  Andrey Sorin 
 2008 - North Wind -  Vsevolod Grinko 
 2008 - Quiet family life -  Gleb 
 2008 - Keep me rain -  Evgeny Steklov 
 2008 - Echo from the past -  Viktor Zhukov 
 2009 - The Brothers Karamazov -  Ivan Karamazov 
 2009 - One family -  Zhukov, director of the orphanage 
 2009 - Desire -  Victor, architect 
 2009 - Following the Phoenix -  Alexey 
 2009 - Soundtrack of Passion -  Kosbutsky 
 2010 - Crimson snowfall -  Konstantin Gerstel, brother of Xenia 
 2010 - Turbulence Zone
 2010 - In the Style of Jazz -  actor 
 2010 - 43rd issue -  Andrey Golota 
 2010 - Private investigation of retired colonel -  Denis Konyshev 
 2010 - Who am I? - investigator
 2011 - Furtseva -  Nikita Vsevolozhsky 
 2011 - What Men Still Talk About -  Valera, FSB officer
 2011 - Pandora -  Andrey Vityaev 
 2011 - Rose Valley - Nuno
 2012 - The Ballad of Uhlans -  Kiknadze 
 2012 - August Eighth -  Alexey, adviser to the president 
 2012 - Steel Butterfly -  Grigory Khanin, opera 
 2012 - Long-legged and beloved -  Nikolai Erdman 
 2013 - Metro -  Vlad Konstantinov 
 2013 - Vangelia -  Alexey Neznamov, Soviet intelligence officer, hypnotist doctor 
 2013 - Marriage by testament 3. Dancing on coals - Ilya Kovalev
 2013 - I will never forget you -  Sergey, driver 
 2013 - Embracing the sky - Ivan Kotov (adult)
 2013 - Marathon -  Stanislav, water polo player 
 2013 - City Spies -  Andrey Shpagin 
 2014 - Chagall — Malevich -  Kazimir Malevich 
 2014 - Kuprin.  Yama - husband of Vera"
 2015 - The Dawns here are Quiet ... -  Comrade 'Third', Major  2015 - Orlova and Alexandrov -  Grigory Alexandrov  2015 - Bartender -  regular bartender  2015 - The war of the sexes -  Konstantin Evseevich  2015 - Snow and ash -  Zinovy Borisovich Velyaminov, colonel  2015 - The heirs -  German Borisovich Zvonarevsky, political scientist  2015 - Immediately get married -  Nikolay  2015 - SOS, Santa Claus, or Everything will come true! -  Nikolai Andreevich Orlov, director of Avtoradio  2016 - Pure Art -  investigator  2016 - Close your eyes -  Foki's dad  2016 - The Wall - King Sigismund III  2016 - Moth - Serge  2016 - I will love you, can I? -  Vadim  2017 - Blast wave - Denis Brunov  2017 - Optimists - Black 2017 - Doctor Richter - Dr. Lev Viktorovich Zharkov 2017 - House of Porcelain -  Valery Luzhin, General of the KGB  2017 - Confused - Boris Morozov  2017 - Garden Ring - Andrey 2017 - Portrait of the second wife -  Yuri Ratnikov  2018 - Day till -  Father of Mishka and Nastya  2018 - Crow -  Major Sergei Kabanov, investigator UK  2019 - Vocal-criminal ensemble - Arkady Semyonovich Zolotarevsky, singer  2019 - Call Center - Igor Markovich Zuev, FSB Lieutenant Colonel  2020 - Passengers - Igor 2021 - Love - Maxim 2021 - Quarantine - Felix 2023 - Mira - Arabov Dubbing 
 2013 - Romeo and Juliet - Signor Capulet 
 2017 - Holiday Party - James (Gilles Lellouche) 

 Voiceover 
 2006 - Prince Vladimir -  Yaropolk  2017 - Kamchatka bears. Beginning of Life (documentary) - voiceover''

Family 
 First wife (1995-2006): Marina Golub - actress and TV presenter.  No children.
 Second wife (since 2006): Inessa Moskvicheva - designer;  she has a daughter from her first marriage - Ekaterina (born 1998).  The marriage with Moskvicheva was registered on June 1, 2013.
Children from the second marriage: son - Maxim (born June 19, 2007), daughter - Victoria (born June 29, 2010).

References

External links
 

 Official website
 Moscow Art Theater page

1972 births
Living people
Russian male film actors
Russian male television actors
Male actors from Moscow
20th-century Russian male actors
21st-century Russian male actors
Russian Academy of Theatre Arts alumni
KVN
Russian people of Jewish descent
Russian people of Ukrainian-Jewish descent
Russian activists against the 2022 Russian invasion of Ukraine